Inta is a town in the Komi Republic, Russia. Population:

History
Inta was founded circa 1940 as a settlement to support a geological expedition to explore coal deposits and projecting of mines.

The city's name is in the Nenets language and means 'well-watered place.'

During the Soviet era, a "corrective labor camp", Intalag, was located here.

Administrative and municipal status
Within the framework of administrative divisions, it is, together with two urban-type settlements (Verkhnyaya Inta and Kozhym) and twenty rural localities, incorporated as the town of republic significance of Inta—an administrative unit with the status equal to that of the districts. As a municipal division, the town of republic significance of Inta is incorporated as Inta Urban Okrug.

Transportation
It is served by the Inta Airport and the Kotlas–Vorkuta railway line. Inta is situated on the banks of the river Bolshoya Inta.

Transmitter
At Inta, there is a CHAYKA-transmitter with a 460-meter tall guyed mast, which is the second-tallest structure in Europe.

Notable people
Birthplace of Soviet national hockey team player Viktor Zhluktov
Birthplace of Belarusian national hockey team, NHL, and KHL player Vladimir Tsyplakov

References

Notes

Sources

External links

Official website of Inta 
Inta Business Directory 

Cities and towns in the Komi Republic
Populated places of Arctic Russia
Road-inaccessible communities of Russia

koi:Инта каркытш
diq:Inta